The Women's United States Squash Open 2011 is the women's edition of the 2011 United States Open (squash), which is a WSA World Series event Gold (prize money: $60 000). The event took place at the Daskalakis Athletic Center in Philadelphia, Pennsylvania in the United States from the 30th of September to the 6th October. Laura Massaro won her first US Open trophy, beating Kasey Brown in the final.

Prize money and ranking points
For 2011, the prize purse was $60,000. The prize money and points breakdown is as follows:

Seeds

Draw and results

See also
United States Open (squash)
2011 Women's World Open Squash Championship
Men's United States Open (squash) 2011
WSA World Series 2011

References

External links
WSA US Open 2011 website
US Squash Open official website
US Squash Open 2011 Squashinfo website

Squash tournaments in the United States
Women's US Open
Women's US Open
2011 in sports in Pennsylvania
2011 in women's squash
Squash in Pennsylvania